"The Stone" is a song by American band Ashes Divide and is their debut single from their debut album Keep Telling Myself It's Alright, which was released on April 8, 2008. The music video for the song was released in March.

Background
"The Stone" is actually derived from a song done by Billy Howerdel during his time in A Perfect Circle. An instrumental named "Army" has many similarities with this song. It was done during demo sessions that yielded material from their first album, Mer de Noms. It apparently wasn't deemed a fit for A Perfect Circle music, so Billy re-worked it on his own for years until it appeared in this form.

Howerdel said he had most of the verses written, but was stuck on the chorus, so he reached out to Johnette Napolitano, singer of Concrete Blonde, who wrote a few lines in the chorus, adding a "maternal" touch to it, according to Howerdel.

On the lyrics, Howerdel said, "It's this push-pull of protection, feeling the need or want to protect your loved ones in a way, but not being worthy enough with yourself to accept that same protection, that same kind of love. A lot of these songs are dealing with pushing people away, with not loving yourself enough to let somebody love you."

Track listing
 "The Stone" - 3:49

Chart performance
"The Stone" garnered attention from U.S. rock radio stations and has been regularly played on the airwaves. It peaked at No. 7 on the Billboard Mainstream Rock Tracks chart and No. 10 on the Modern Rock Tracks chart.

References

2008 debut singles
2007 songs
Island Records singles
Songs written by Billy Howerdel